Ignacio Cechi (born 26 July 2001) is an Argentine professional footballer who plays as a midfielder for Lanús.

Career
Cechi joined the academy of Lanús at a young age. After training with the first-team in 2018, the midfielder was promoted into Luis Zubeldía's squad towards the end of 2020. He initially appeared in pre-season friendlies, notably scoring against Defensores de Belgrano, before making the substitute's bench for Copa de la Liga Profesional fixtures with Newell's Old Boys and Aldosivi in November and December; having penned pro terms in September. Cechi's senior debut arrived on 3 January 2021 in the same competition, as he replaced Matías Esquivel with sixteen minutes left of an eventual 1–1 away draw against Patronato.

Style of play
Cechi is a versatile midfielder, capable of playing out wide or centrally.

Career statistics
.

Notes

References

External links

2001 births
Living people
Sportspeople from Buenos Aires Province
Argentine footballers
Association football midfielders
Argentine Primera División players
Primera Nacional players
Club Atlético Lanús footballers
Club Atlético Mitre footballers